Pearl is an unincorporated community in Dickinson County, Kansas, United States.

History

Pearl had a post office from 1883 until 1935.

The Rock Island served the area for many years until the company ceased operation in 1980.  The track was then used by various rail lines until being abandoned in the mid-1990s. While part of the line was scrapped, the remaining track from Abilene to Woodbine has been purchased by the Abilene and Smoky Valley Railroad.

All that remains in Pearl today are the railroad tracks, the CO-OP grain elevator, and the ruins of a solitary stone house.

Education
The community is served by Chapman USD 473 public school district.

Notable people
 Sam R. Heller, former president of Eisenhower Foundation which helped build the Eisenhower Library & Museum in Abilene.

References

Further reading

External links
 Dickinson County maps: Current, Historic, KDOT

Unincorporated communities in Dickinson County, Kansas
Unincorporated communities in Kansas
Populated places established in 1887
1887 establishments in Kansas